Central Asia Insurance is known as "Asuransi Central Asia" or "ACA Asuransi", and is one of the five most important Indonesian insurance agencies, with 36 branch office and 34 representative offices around Indonesia.

The ACA company was established in 1956 with the name "Oriental NV" .On 5 August 1958 it was renamed "PT. Asuransi Central Asia".

The company has 1300+ employees and grosses in the range of 958 million rupiah per year.

References

External links
Company official website

Financial services companies established in 1956
Insurance companies of Indonesia
Companies based in Jakarta
Indonesian brands